"Better Off Asleep" is a standalone single released by the band Magic Eight Ball.

Track listing

Personnel

Musicians 
 Baz Francis - Vocals, acoustic guitar and kazoo

Production 
 Lewis John - Recording, engineering, mixing and mastering
 Baz Francis - Producing
 Phil John - Producing

Art direction 
 Andrea Duarte - Cover photography

References

External links 

2015 singles
2015 songs